Allegheny station is a rapid transit station on SEPTA Market–Frankford Line in Philadelphia, Pennsylvania. It is located at the intersection of Kensington and Allegheny avenues (known as "K&A") and H Street in the Kensington neighborhood of North Philadelphia. The station is also served by SEPTA City Bus routes 3, 60, and 89.

History

Allegheny is part of the Frankford Elevated section of the line, which began service on November 5, 1922.

Between 1988 and 2003, SEPTA undertook a $493.3 million reconstruction of the  Frankford Elevated. Allegheny station was completely rebuilt on the site of the original station; the project included new platforms, elevators, windscreens, and overpasses, and the station now meets ADA accessibility requirements. The line had originally been built with track ballast and was replaced with precast sections of deck, allowing the station (and the entire line) to remain open throughout the project.

In 2019, the Philadelphia Weekly magazine called the intersection "one of the most notorious drug corners" of the city; a controversial plan to build a supervised injection site near the station on Hilton Street was announced in March of that year.

Station layout
Access to the station is via the southwest corner of Allegheny and Kensington avenues. There is also an eastbound platform exit-only stair to the northeast corner of the intersection.

References

External links

Images from NYCSubway.org
Station entrance from Google Maps Street View
Station exit from Google Maps Street View

SEPTA Market-Frankford Line stations
Railway stations in Philadelphia
Railway stations in the United States opened in 1922